In financial markets, an equity issuance is the sale of new equity or stock by a firm to investors. Equity issuance can involve a private sale, in which the transaction between investors and the firm takes place directly, or publicly, in which case the firm has to register the securities with the authorities and the sale takes place in an organized market, open to any registered investor, a process more akin to an auction. Two common types of public equity issuance are initial public offerings (IPOs) and Secondary equity offerings (SEOs or FO). This is one of the ways firms finance themselves, that is, they obtain funds from investors in order to engage in business.

Role of investment banks
Investment banks, such as Goldman Sachs or Morgan Stanley are frequently intermediaries in the equity issue process, and for some of these firms the fees associated with IPOs are a substantial part of their income. The role of these banks is to study the characteristics and business plans of the firm which is issuing equity and then recommend a minimum purchase price to investors. On the other hand, they are in charge of convincing investors that the purchase is a good opportunity and therefore the success of IPO placement partly hinges on the reputation of the investment bank that is doing it.

Often it is done by joint stock companies to raise money.

See also
Thomson Financial league tables
Underwriting

References

Initial public offering